This is a list of people who have served as Custos Rotulorum of Rutland.

 Sir Edward Montagu bef. 1544–1557
 Kenelm Digby bef. 1558–1590
 Thomas Cecil, 1st Earl of Exeter bef. 1594–1623
 George Villiers, 1st Duke of Buckingham 1623–1628
 Edward Noel, 2nd Viscount Campden 1628–1643
 Interregnum
 Baptist Noel, 3rd Viscount Campden 1660–1682
 Edward Noel, 1st Earl of Gainsborough 1682–1689
 Bennet Sherard, 2nd Baron Sherard 1690–1700
For later custodes rotulorum, see Lord Lieutenant of Rutland.

References

Institute of Historical Research - Custodes Rotulorum 1544-1646
Institute of Historical Research - Custodes Rotulorum 1660-1828

Rutland